Hydrostachys imbricata is a species of aquatic flowering plant in the genus Hydrostachys.

References

Hydrostachyaceae